The Havana Sugar Kings were a Cuban-based minor league baseball team that played from 1946 to 1960.  From 1954 until 1960, they belonged in the Class AAA International League, affiliated with Major League Baseball's Cincinnati Reds. Their home stadium was El Gran Estadio del Cerro (sometimes called Gran Stadium) in Havana.

History
The Sugar Kings began life in 1946 as the Havana Cubans, founded by Washington Senators scout Joe Cambria. Led by manager Oscar Rodriguez, the Cubans experienced tremendous success both on and off the field. Havana finished first in Class C (later Class B) Florida International League in each of their first five seasons of play, winning over 100 games twice and compiling a record of 474-249 in five years under Rodriguez. The overall record would be even better had Havana not been stripped of 17 wins in 1946 for having too many experienced players for their class. Nonetheless, the Cubans still had the league's top record even without the victories.

Havana then won consecutive FIL championships in 1947 and 1948. The 1947 Cubans were recognized as one of the 100 greatest minor league teams of all time. The team was also successful at the box office, leading  the league in attendance each year from 1946-50. In their first three seasons, Havana led all Class C teams in attendance, including a mark of 264,813 in 1947 that is still the highest total ever recorded by a Class C franchise.

During the 1953 season, Roberto "Bobby" Maduro bought the team and immediately had aspirations of bringing Major League Baseball to Havana. After the 1953, the Springfield Cubs folded, leaving an opening in the Triple-A International League. Maduro moved his franchise to the IL and renamed it the Sugar Kings. After playing the 1954 season as an independent club, the franchise signed an agreement with the Cincinnati Reds for the 1955 season and the Sugar Kings became Cincinnati's top farm club for the remainder of their existence. In addition to Reds prospects, several talented Cuban players and other Latinos who eventually made it to the Major Leagues donned the Sugar Kings uniform, including Luis Arroyo, Pompeyo Davalillo, Tony González, Cookie Rojas, Elio Chacón, Danny Morejón, Preston Gómez, Leo Cárdenas, and Mike Cuellar.

In their inaugural season at the Triple-A level, the Sugar Kings drew 295,453 fans despite a fifth-place finish, second behind only pennant-winning Toronto. The next season, Havana won 87 games, their most in IL play, and drew a franchise-record 313,232 fans, again second to Toronto. However, the Sugar Kings were eliminated by the Maple Leafs in the Governors' Cup playoffs.

The next three seasons were less successful, as Havana finished with identical 72-82 records in 1956-57, finishing in sixth place both years. In 1957, attendance cratered to 84,320, less than half that of any other IL club. However, despite a franchise-worse 65-88 record and last-place finish in 1958, attendance rebounded to 178,000.

1959 championship
In 1959, led by future major league manager Preston Gómez, the Sugar Kings rebounded to finish 80-73, finishing third in the IL standings. Amid revolution in Cuba that saw Fidel Castro rise to power, the Sugar Kings did not escape the turmoil. The most notable incident occurred on the night of July 25 in a home game against the Rochester Red Wings. As the game drug on into extra innings, the clock passed midnight to the 26th, marking the anniversary of the beginning of the Cuban Revolution. Celebratory gunfire outside the ballpark grazed Rochester shortstop Leo Cardenas and third base coach Frank Verdi, who both sustained minor injuries. Rochester pulled their team off the field and left Cuba, cancelling the final game of the series.

However, the Sugar Kings were allowed to finish out their schedule and returned to the postseason. In the playoffs, Havana swept Columbus 4-0 and defeated Richmond 4-2 to win the Governors' Cup. They then took on the Minneapolis Millers of the American Association in the Junior World Series. After two games with small crowds and frigid conditions at Metropolitan Stadium, the decision was made to move the balance of the series to Havana.

On their home turf, the Sugar Kings took the series the distance, rallying to walk off in Game 7 to take the series 4-3. The five games in Havana drew 100,000 people.

Nationalization and departure from Cuba
In 1960, Castro nationalized all U.S.-owned enterprises in Cuba, and on July 8, Baseball Commissioner Ford Frick (under pressure from Secretary of State Christian Herter) announced that the Sugar Kings would move to Jersey City, New Jersey, and became the Jersey City Jerseys. They lasted only through the 1961 season, then folded due to poor attendance. The franchise was then sold to a Florida group from Jacksonville and became the Jacksonville Suns, who began play in the International League in 1962.  That franchise moved to Portsmouth, Virginia, in 1969 and became the Tidewater Tides, and remains in that region as the Norfolk Tides.

In February 1987, the Miami City Commission voted unanimously in favor of the renaming Miami Stadium in honor of Bobby Maduro, who had migrated to USA.  The ballpark became known officially as Bobby Maduro Miami Stadium one month later. In the ceremony  Maduro's widow Marta said to herself, "Gordo (fat one), they finally know who you are."

2021 Miami Marlins alternate uniform
On May 17, 2021, The Miami Marlins unveiled a new alternate uniform which pays homage to the old Sugar Kings uniform.

Season-by-season record

Notable alumni
Luis Arroyo (1959–60) MLB All-Star
Sandy Consuegra (1949) MLB All-Star
Mike Cuellar (1957–60) MLB All-Star
Bobby Estalella (1950)
Mike Fornieles (1952) MLB All-Star
Preston Gomez (1959, MGR)
Tony Gonzalez (baseball) (1958–59)
Mike Guerra (1952, MGR)
Connie Marrero (1947-1949) MLB All-Star, 2015 Caribbean Baseball Hall of Fame inductee
Armando Marsans (1953, MGR)
Orlando Pena (1957–58, '60) 2000 Caribbean Baseball Hall of Fame inductee
Nap Reyes (1956–58, '60, MGR) 2015 Caribbean Baseball Hall of Fame inductee
Cookie Rojas (1959–60) MLB All-Star

See also
Category:Havana Sugar Kings players

References

External links
SABR.org – The Short but Exciting Life of the Havana Sugar Kings

1946 establishments in Cuba
1960 disestablishments in Cuba
Cincinnati Reds minor league affiliates
Defunct baseball teams in Cuba
Defunct International League teams
Baseball in Havana
Sports clubs disestablished in 1960
Baseball teams established in 1946
Washington Senators minor league affiliates
Baseball teams disestablished in 1960